Sejong Center for the Performing Arts is the largest arts and cultural complex in Seoul, South Korea. It has an interior area of 53,202m². It is situated in the center of the capital, on Sejongno, a main road that cuts through the capital city of the Joseon Dynasty. The center took 4 years to complete, opening in 1978. It was "built as a cultural center for Seoulites." It currently contains one of the biggest pipe organs in Asia.

History
After the Seoul National Hall was destroyed by fire in 1972, the City Council of Seoul commissioned the construction of a venue to continue the cultural heritage of that structure. Built in 1978, commissioned by the City of Seoul, Sejong Center was largely unsupported financially for 20 years, being under the control of the Special City of Seoul. In 1999, the center was placed under control of a foundation governed by civilians whose passion for the arts fueled its massive newfound success. This venue hosted Miss Universe 1980.

The center's design was based on a fusion of Korean national symbols and the western architectural designs. The name "Sejong" is from the 4th ruling king of the Joseon Dynasty, Sejong the Great.

On 23 September 2012, the Seoul Metropolitan Government started on a trial basis, a 550-m designated section of Sejong-ro as pedestrian-only but permitted for cyclists. The section includes the road from the Gwanghwamun three-way intersection, along Gwanghwamun Plaza in front of the Sejong Center to the Sejong-ro intersection.

Facilities

 
The Sejong Center is made up of many different halls, centers and theaters.

Main Auditorium
The "Big" Theater as it is called in Korean, is a technologically advanced theater. It opened in 1999 to show Shim Hyung-rae's Yonggary and has a capacity for 3,000 people and is the biggest Theater at the country.

Minor Hall
Called The "Small" Theater in Korean, is constructed in an interesting style over 2 floors, and can seat 442 people, the stage can allow for 100 people on performance.

Arts Forum Galleries
Main Gallery: The Arts Forum is a large room (1,056 m2) that is divided into 4 separate rooms for viewings of different sizes and numbers.
New Gallery: The New Gallery is a (594 m2) place for artwork that excels in  the social, popular and cultural side of Korean art.
Gwang Hwa Moon Gallery: Originally part of the 5th Line Subway Metro System, it houses artworks that are considered to be outstanding by the youth and new up-and-coming artists. Considered to be an example of Subway Art Galleries.

Gwang Hwa Rang
The Gwang Hwa Rang is situated underneath the Sejong-ro crossroads, it opened on February 17, 2005, with complete free access to pedestrians and art-discerning Seoulites. It includes a window-gallery that enable by-passers on ground level to peek inside.

Sejong Convention Center and Hall
The Convention Center and Hall is usually used for big events and conferences. With a size of 627 m2, it can house around 400 people. It is available for many different events. It includes 250 translating systems that interprets five different languages simultaneously. The convention hall has a smaller size convention center that is used for similar purposes and is able to accommodate 120 people.

Sam Chung Gak
Measuring in 19417m², Sam Chung Gak is a collaboration of six traditional Korean Housings. Since 2001, it has been used by the center as a place for traditional heritage experience.

Resident companies
Seoul Philharmonic
 Seoul National Philharmonic
 Seoul Metropolitan Theater Company
 City of Seoul Musical Company
 Seoul Metropolitan Chorus
 Seoul National Traditional Dance Company
 Seoul Metropolitan Opera
 Seoul Youth Orchestra
 Seoul Youth Choir

See also
Contemporary culture of South Korea
List of concert halls
Sejong the Great of Joseon
Statue of King Sejong (Gwanghwamun)

References

External links
Official website

Jongno District
Arts centres in South Korea
Theatres in South Korea
Concert halls in South Korea
Culture of Seoul
Buildings and structures in Seoul
Tourist attractions in Seoul
Sejong the Great